James Nash may refer to:

James Nash (MP) (died 1400), English politician
James Nash (prospector) (1834–1913), Australian gold prospector
Jimmy Nash (1871–1952), New Zealand politician
James J. Nash (1875–1927), American Medal of Honor recipient
Jim Nash (footballer) (1914–1984), Australian rules footballer
James Nash (ecotheologian) (1938–2008), Christian ecotheologian
Jim Nash (baseball) (born 1945), American baseball player
Jim Nash (politician) (born 1967), American politician in Minnesota
James Nash (racing driver) (born 1985), British auto racing driver
James Nash (bishop) (1862–1943), Anglican Bishop-coadjutor of Cape Town
James Nash (musician) (born 1973), American guitarist and recording artist
It is also a jail in Oakden, South Australia

See also
Nash (surname)